Post-traumatic refers to conditions following a physical trauma, i.e. an injury or damage caused by physical harm, or a psychological trauma:

 Post Traumatic (EP), album by American musician Mike Shinoda
 Post Traumatic, album by American musician Mike Shinoda
 Post-concussion syndrome
 Post-traumatic abortion syndrome
 Post-traumatic amnesia
 Post-traumatic embitterment syndrome
 Post-traumatic epilepsy
 Post-traumatic growth
 Post-traumatic punctate intraepidermal hemorrhage
 Post-traumatic seizure
 Post-traumatic stress disorder
 Complex post-traumatic stress disorder

See also 
 Post Traumatic Slave Syndrome